"Hustler" is a single from Simian Mobile Disco's debut album Attack Decay Sustain Release. It features Char Johnson on lead vocals.
It was featured in DJ Hero 2 as part of the "Electro Hits" DLC pack, mixed with "Pump Up The Jam" by Technotronic.

Track listings

12"
 "Hustler (Armand Van Helden remix)" 5:41
 "Hustler (Extended Club Mix)" 6:36

Download
 "Hustler" 3:42
 "Hustler (Armand Van Helden remix)" 5:41
 "Hustler (A-Trak Remix)" 5:37
 "Hustler (Extended Club Mix)" 6:36
 "Hustler (Jesse Rose Remix)" 6:08

Music video
The video for "Hustler” depicts numerous girls sitting in a circle playing chinese whispers before devolving into kissing each other in succession.

References

2006 singles
Simian Mobile Disco songs
2006 songs
Wichita Recordings singles
Obscenity controversies in music